Afida Turner (born Hafidda Messaï on December 22, 1976) is a French media personality. In 2007, she married musician Ronnie Turner. In 2011, she released the singles Come With Me, followed by Born an Angel, from her studio album Paris-Hollywood.

Turner has appeared in small roles in several films.

She also starred in the stageplay Requiem for une conne (2022). In 2022, she released the single Étienne.

Biography 
Afida Turner was born in Auchel, France. Her father was from Algeria and her mother from Réunion. When she was two years old, her father beat her mother to death. She lived with foster families until she was 16. She then worked as a saleswoman in ready-to-wear and was once employed by the Parisian bar-lounge Buddha Bar.

In the 1990s, she started a singing career, releasing the song "Crazy About You" in 1998. She came to the public and media attention in 2002 by appearing in the second season of Loft Story, a reality show, as Lesly.

In 2002, Turner signed with Sony Music and released her first album called Rock Attitude under the name Lesly Mess.

Turner made appearances in three films, Shut Up and Shoot (2006), The Sweep (2008) and Single Black Female (2009).

In 2011, she released her second album called Paris-Hollywood, including the smash hit single Come With Me. She subsequently appeared as a guest star and host on various French TV shows.

In 2013, she played a role in the film Visions Interdites.

In 2018, she played a role in the drama Lumière Noire by Enguerrand Jouvin.

In 2022, she played the lead in Requiem pour une conne by Baptiste Souriau at Théâtre Trévise, Paris starting in January and running successfully for six months.

In July 2022, she released a cover version of Guesch Patti′s song Étienne.

Personal life 
She had a relationship with Coolio lasting two years and also  with American boxer Mike Tyson. In 2007, she married musician Ronnie Turner, the son of Ike and Tina Turner. She started to use the name Afida Turner. Ronnie died on December 9, 2022 at the age of 62. According to reports, he had suffered from various health issues over the years, including cancer.

Politics 
On May 31, 2020, Turner announced her candidacy for President of France in the 2022 election. She is running on a platform opposing police violence and in favor of the Yellow Vests Movement. If elected, she would be the first female and first African President of the Republic. However, on January 11, 2021, she announced that she was withdrawing her candidacy.

Filmography

Films 
2006: Shut Up and Shoot! as Fifi Belmondo
2008: The Sweep as Bank Manager
2009: Single Black Female as Blue
2013: Visions Interdites as The Singer
2018: Lumière noire as the gynaecologist

Television 
2000: H: Woman in the Sabri pub
2002: Loft Story
2009 Criminal Minds: Herself (season 4, episode 25)
2014: Un dîner presque parfait M6
2015: Nrj 12 le mag
2017: Nrj  12 le mag
2020: Touche pas à mon poste
2022: Touche pas à mon poste
2022: Touche pas à mon poste
2022: Un dîner presque parfait : special guest 
2023: Touche pas à mon poste People

Music videos 
2003: Shut Up cameo (Black Eyed Peas)

Discography

Albums 
2003: Roc Attitude  (2003)
2011: Paris Hollywood (2011)

Singles 

1998: Crazy About You
2002: Pas celle que tu crois / Tu mens
2002: Vilaine fille
2003: Repose au paradis / Je t'ai en moi
2011: Come with Me
2014: Born an Angel
2022: Etienne

Theater 
2022: Requiem pour une conne as Ina Star

Other endeavors 
2002: Book biographie : My father killed my mom by Michel Lafon editions.
2016: Afida Turner (fragrance)
2016: MuchCouture by Afida Turner (clothing and swimsuit line)
2019: Afida Turner jewelry collections by Stephano Andolfi

References

External links 
 

1976 births
French women singers
Participants in French reality television series
French people of Algerian descent
French people of Réunionnais descent
Living people
French expatriates in the United States
21st-century French singers
21st-century French women